Auranticordis is a genus of marine meiofaunal amoeboflagellates. The sole known species, Auranticordis quadriverberis, is a heart shaped cell with four flagellae. It contains orange inclusions which may be cyanobacterial endosymbionts.

References

Cercozoa genera
Monotypic SAR supergroup genera